San Miguel Jaltocan is a town of Nextlalpan, in the state of Mexico State, north of Mexico Valley.

See also 
Xaltocan

References

Populated places in the State of Mexico
Nextlalpan
Otomi settlements
Nahua settlements